Charles Antoine Cabot (1806 – 11 February 1886) was a 19th-century French playwright, chansonnier and writer.

First an actor at the theatres de la Gaîté, des Nouveautés, de l'Ambigu, du Cirque and de la Porte Saint-Martin (1837–40), he became dramaturge at the Théâtre historique and the Théâtre de la Gaîté (1847), then general dramaturge at the Théâtre du Châtelet (1863–1874). His plays were presented on the most important Parisian stages of the 19th century.

Works 

 Catastrophe épouvantable arrivée au puisatier Giraud et à son compagnon Jala, with Amédée de Jallais, 1854
 La Corde du pendu, two-act comédie en vaudeville, with de Jallais and Édouard Cadol, 1854
 La Mauvaise aventure d'une pauvre parfumeuse, with de Jallais, 1854
 Sous un bec de gaz, scène de la vie nocturne, with de Jallais and Léon Lelarge, 1854
 Nicodème sur la terre, one-act vaudeville, with de Jallais, 1855
 Jacqueline Doucette, one-act vaudeville, with de Jallais, 1855
 Le Médecin sans enfants, ou le don Juan de Vincennes et ce qu'on perd quand on a une paire de pères, parody in 2 tableaux, with de Jallais, 1855
 L'Envoyé de Dieu, 1856
 Mon ami l'habit vert, one-act vaudeville, with Théodore Barrière, 1857
 Roger Bontemps à la représentation de la Fausse adultère, with de Jallais, 1857
 Les Cosaques, drama in 8 tableaux, with de Jallais, 1857 
 Une Aventure sous Louis XV, one-act vaudeville, 1858
 Les Deux Barbes, one-act vaudeville, 1858
 Un Monsieur qui a la vue basse, one-act vaudeville, 1858
 Madame Croquemitaine, ou les Souterrains de la Roche-Noire, three-act vaudeville, with Henry de Kock, 1859
 L'histoire d'un drapeau racontée par un zouave, complainte en trop de couplets, with de Jallais, 1860
 Les Chinois au Châtelet, parodie burlesque sur la prise de Pékin, 1862
 Les Aventures de Mandrin, historical and fantastic drama, 1865
 Les Malheurs d'un homme heureux, one-act vaudeville, 1865
 La Béquille du diable boiteux, 1866
 Les Aventures merveilleuses de Gulliver, 1867
 La chambre ardente, histoire de la Marquise de Brinvilliers, la célèbre empoisonneuse, 1868
 La Chatte blanche, 1869
 Les Compagnons de la Marjolaine, 1869
 Patrie ! ou le Passé, le présent et l'avenir, stances en l'honneur du centième anniversaire de Napoléon Ier, et de la fête de S. M. Napoléon III. La Reine des anges, cantate en l'honneur du 15 août, 1869
 Mignonne, one-act comedy, 1871
 La Légende de Cendrillon ou les égarements d'une pantoufle, 1873
 Allez à Saint-Honoré les Bains, 1881
 François les Bras Bleus, three-act opéra comique, 1883
 Chansons et monologues, undated

Bibliography 
 Gazette anecdotique, littéraire, artistique et bibliographique, 1886, (p. 91) (obituary)
 Henry Lyonnet, Dictionnaire des comédiens français, 1911

External links 
 Charles Cabot on Data.bnf.fr

19th-century French dramatists and playwrights
French chansonniers
1806 births
1886 deaths